Wrong Way Kid is a 1983 American made-for-television animated film starring Dick Van Dyke, Keith Coogan, Derek Barton, June Foray, Stan Freberg, Melanie Gaffin, Joan Gerber, Wayne Hall, Don Messick, Jason Naylor and Arnold Stang. The film originally aired on March 16, 1983 as a presentation of CBS Library, an anthology series of animated and live-action versions of children's books.

Plot
Chris is an insecure boy who, after an encounter with a 203-year-old bookworm, begins developing his self-confidence; he does things the wrong way: derrierewards, frontwards, upside down, inside out, etc.. It was written by George Arthur Bloom and directed by Lawrence Levy and Sam Weiss.

Voice cast
Dick Van Dyke as Father  
Keith Coogan as Chris

External links

1983 television films
1983 films
CBS network films
Nickelodeon original films